Seaca de Pădure is a commune in Dolj County, Oltenia, Romania with a population of 1,358 people. It is composed of three villages: Răchita de Sus, Seaca de Pădure and Veleni.

References

Communes in Dolj County
Localities in Oltenia